Diego Cristín and Eduardo Schwank won in the final 6–4, 7–5, against Juan Pablo Brzezicki and David Marrero.

Seeds
The top seed received a bye to the first round.

Draw

Draw

References
 Doubles Draw

Copa Petrobras Santiago - Doubles
2009 Doubles